Solon (c. 638 BC–558 BC) was an Athenian statesman, lawmaker and poet.

Solon may also refer to:


People
 Solon (given name)
 Solon (surname)
 Solon people, a subgroup of the Evenks living in northeastern China

Places in the United States
 Solon, Iowa, a city
 Solon, Maine, a town
 Solon, New York, a town
 Solon, Ohio, a city

Other uses
 Solon SE, a German solar energy company
 Solon High School, Solon, Ohio
 Solon language, former name of the Evenki language
 Sacramento Solons, any of several minor league baseball teams in Sacramento, California
 A term for "mentor" or "teacher" in the Nickelodeon show Mysticons

See also 
Solon Township, Leelanau County, Michigan
Solon Township, Kent County, Michigan